Georgiyevskoye is a rural locality (a selo) in Lipovskoye Rural Settlement of Velsky District, Arkhangelsk Oblast, Russia. The population was 105 as of 2014. There are 6 streets.

Geography 
Georgiyevskoye is located on the Verkhopuyskoye Lake, 120 km northwest of Velsk (the district's administrative centre) by road. Kuznetsovskaya is the nearest rural locality.

References 

Rural localities in Velsky District